Ayo Saka (born 22 December 1990) is a Nigerian international footballer who plays for Lobi Stars as a midfielder.

Career
Born in Lagos, Saka has also played club football in Nigeria for Union Bank, Heartland, Ocean Boys, Enyimba, Dolphins, Sunshine Stars, Rivers United and Lobi Stars.

He made his international debut for Nigeria in 2010.

References

1992 births
Living people
Nigerian footballers
Nigeria international footballers
Union Bank F.C. players
Heartland F.C. players
Ocean Boys F.C. players
Enyimba F.C. players
Dolphin F.C. (Nigeria) players
Sunshine Stars F.C. players
Rivers United F.C. players
Lobi Stars F.C. players
Nigeria Professional Football League players
Sportspeople from Lagos
Association football midfielders